Planaltina Esporte Clube, commonly known as Planaltina, are a Brazilian football team from Planaltina, in Distrito Federal. They competed in the Série C once.

History
The club was founded on May 30, 1963. Planaltina competed in the Série C in 1996, being eliminated in the First Stage of the competition.

Stadium
Planaltina Esporte Clube play their home games at Estádio Adonir José Guimarães. The stadium has a maximum capacity of 6,000 people.

References

Association football clubs established in 1963
Football clubs in Federal District (Brazil)
1963 establishments in Brazil